Kenmare High School is an all-female, private, Roman Catholic high school in Jersey City, in Hudson County, New Jersey, United States. It is located within the Roman Catholic Archdiocese of Newark. The school has been accredited by the Middle States Association of Colleges and Schools Commission on Secondary Schools since 1992.

As of the 2015–16 school year, the school had an enrollment of 121 students and 10.9 classroom teachers (on an FTE basis), for a student–teacher ratio of 11.1:1. The school's student body was 49.6% Black, 14.1% Hispanic, 1.7% White, 0.8% Asian and 33.9% two or more races.

Kenmare is an alternative high school for young women (ages 17+) who have dropped out of other high schools. The school is operated through the York Street Project as part of an effort to reduce rates of poverty in households headed by women, through a program that offers small class sizes, individualized learning and development of life skills.

References

External links 
School Website
Data for Kenmare Alternative High School, National Center for Education Statistics

Middle States Commission on Secondary Schools
1989 establishments in New Jersey
Educational institutions established in 1989
Girls' schools in New Jersey
Private high schools in Hudson County, New Jersey
Catholic secondary schools in New Jersey
Roman Catholic Archdiocese of Newark